Caloramator fervidus, previously known as Clostridium fervidus, is a bacterium belonging to the Bacillota.

References

External links
Type strain of Caloramator fervidus at BacDive -  the Bacterial Diversity Metadatabase

Clostridiaceae
Bacteria described in 1987